The 13131 / 32 Kolkata–Patna Junction Express is an Express train belonging to Indian Railways – Eastern Railway zone that runs between Kolkata Chitpur &  in India. Kolkata Anand Vihar Express is shortened to Kolkata Patna Express.

It operates as train number 13131 from Kolkata Chitpur to Patna Junction and as train number 13132 in the reverse direction, serving the states of West Bengal, Jharkhand, Bihar.

Coaches

The 13131 / 32 Kolkata–Patna Junction Express has 1 AC 3 tier, 4 Sleeper class, 2 General Unreserved, 1 High Capacity Parcel coach, 1 Full Postal Van & 2 SLR (Seating cum Luggage Rake) coaches. It does not carry a pantry car.

 
As is customary with most train services in India, coach composition may be amended at the discretion of Indian Railways depending on demand.

Service

Routeing

As the route is fully electrified, a Howrah-based WAP-4 or Asansol-based WAM-4 are the traditional power for this train and haul the train for its entire journey.

Operation

13131 Kolkata–Patna Junction Express runs from Kolkata Chitpur on a daily basis reaching Patna Junction on the 2nd day
13132 Patna Junction–Kolkata Express runs from Patna Junction on a daily basis reaching Kolkata Chitpur on the 2nd day

At first. this train used to run between Kolkata Chitpur railway station and Anand Vihar Terminal. But as the train used to run 15–20 hours late daily, the journey distance was shortened to Patna Junction.

References 

 http://www.nr.indianrailways.gov.in/view_detail.jsp?lang=0&dcd=3825&id=0,4,268
 http://timesofindia.indiatimes.com/city/allahabad/Janta-Express-chugs-on-final-journey-into-history/articleshow/41445947.cms
 https://web.archive.org/web/20141021121220/http://www.thestatesman.net/news/62769-delhi-janata-express-to-continue-regular-services.html?page=1

External links

Delhi–Kolkata trains
Express trains in India
Rail transport in Jharkhand
Rail transport in Bihar
Rail transport in Uttar Pradesh